Christopher Murney (born July 20, 1943) is an American actor and voice artist.

Early life and education
Murney was born in Narragansett, Rhode Island. He earned a bachelor's degree from the University of Rhode Island and a Master of Fine Arts in theatre from Pennsylvania State University.

Career
Murney has worked on the stage, in television series, and in film. In television, he appeared as Buck Miller in 1994 and in 2001 on the soap opera One Life to Live, as Buddy in 1977 The San Pedro Beach Bums, voiced Union soldier, diarist and fellow Rhode Islander Elisha Hunt Rhodes in the PBS mini-series The Civil War (1990), and starred as Mackie Bloom in the first three seasons of Remember WENN. 

In the movies, Murney has appeared in such films as 1977's Slap Shot as Tommy Hanrahan, 1985's The Last Dragon as Eddie Arcadian, 1986's Maximum Overdrive, 1987's The Secret of My Success, 1989's Last Exit to Brooklyn, 1990's Loose Cannons, and in 1991's Barton Fink.

His voice can be heard as Chester Cheetah for Cheetos as Dwayne in the 2006 video game VCPR New World Order, talk radio in Grand Theft Auto: Vice City Stories, as the villain Black Garius in Neverwinter Nights 2, and as various characters in Red Dead Revolver.

Personal life
Murney is married to Anne Kidder and has three children, including Julia Murney. His son, Patrick Murney, has appeared in episodes of Law & Order: Organized Crime and Public Morals.

Filmography

Film

Television

Video games

References

External links

 Official Website
 Christopher Murney, Official Website  

1943 births
Living people
American male film actors
American male television actors
Penn State College of Arts and Architecture alumni
Male actors from Rhode Island
People from Narragansett, Rhode Island
American male video game actors

University of Rhode Island alumni
Pennsylvania State University alumni